Hinckley is a surname. Notable people with the surname include:

Alonzo A. Hinckley (1870–1936), Apostle of The Church of Jesus Christ of Latter-day Saints
Barbara Hinckley (died 1995), political scientist and educator
Bryant S. Hinckley (1867–1961), Latter-day Saint educator
Edwin S. Hinckley (1868–1929), educator and geologist
Frederick W. Hinckley (1868–1929), American politician
George Hinckley (1819–1904), British Royal Navy sailor and Victoria Cross recipient
Gordon B. Hinckley (1910–2008), fifteenth President of The Church of Jesus Christ of Latter-day Saints
Ira Hinckley (1828–1904), early Latter-day Saint leader
Isaac Hinckley (1815–1888), American railroad executive
Jay R. Hinckley (1840–1914), American politician
John Hinckley Jr. (born 1955), shot and wounded President Ronald Reagan and three others
Ken Hinckley (born 1969), American computer scientist
L. Stewart Hinckley (1902–1969), American politician
Lyman G. Hinckley (1832–1887), American politician
May Green Hinckley (1881–1943), Latter-day Saint leader
Mike Hinckley (born 1982), baseball pitcher
Richard Hinckley Allen (1838–1908), American astronomer
Robert Cutler Hinckley (1853–1941), American artist
Robert H. Hinckley (1891–1988), political scientist and founder of the Hinckley Institute of Politics
Thomas Hinckley (1618–1706), last governor of the Plymouth Colony
William Sturgis Hinckley (1806–1846), ninth Alcalde of San Francisco
Susan Hinckley Bradley (1851–1929), American artist
Virginia Hinckley Pearce (born 1945), American writer and Latter-day Saint leader

See also 

 Hindley (surname)
 Hinkley (surname)
 Hinckley (disambiguation)